Ongina is the stage name of Ryan Ong Palao (born January 6, 1982), a Filipino-American drag performer and HIV activist who came to international attention on the first season of RuPaul's Drag Race and the fifth season of RuPaul's Drag Race All Stars. Since appearing on the show, he has been featured in a number of web series produced by World of Wonder, including Wait, What?, Ring My Bell, and Fashion Photo RuView. He was one of the first reality TV stars to come out as HIV-positive.

Early life 
Palao was born in the Philippines in 1982. He and his family relocated to Seattle, Washington in 1994. His original drag name, before Ongina, was Peck-Peck Galore. He started performing in drag in 2003 
at an Asian restaurant called Lucky Cheng's, where he worked alongside then-unknown Laverne Cox.

Drag Race and career 
Ongina was selected as one of nine contestants for the inaugural season of RuPaul's Drag Race and was officially announced on February 2, 2009. He revealed her HIV status in the fourth episode, where he won his second challenge. He was eliminated in the next episode after losing a lip sync to "Stronger", by Britney Spears, against eventual winner BeBe Zahara Benet, placing her in fifth.

Outside of season 1, he made a cameo appearance on the first season of RuPaul's Drag Race All Stars. He also made five appearances in the first and second seasons of RuPaul's Drag U. In November 2017, Ongina was a featured performer in Queens United, a benefit show created by Jaremi Carey in an effort to raise money to people affected by Hurricane Maria.

He appeared as a guest for the first challenge in the premiere of season 11 of Drag Race.

Ongina was in the 2009 music video for "I Gotta Feeling" by The Black Eyed Peas. An animated version of her appeared in the RuPaul's Drag Race: Dragopolis 2.0 mobile app. He appeared in three episodes of the WOW Presents web series Fashion Photo RuView with Mayhem Miller, filling in for Raja and Raven in September and October 2018. He was a backup dancer for Nico Tortorella on an episode of Lip Sync Battle in 2019.

In June 2019, Ongina performed at Motor City Pride. Later that year, he performed at Virginia Pridefest, headlined by Betty Who. Later that year, he starred in Tammie Brown Walking Ongina in Nature!, a "two-woman show", alongside fellow Drag Race alum Tammie Brown, in reference to Tammie's quote: “I don’t see you walking children in nature” from the Drag Race Season 1 reunion.

On May 8, 2020, Ongina was announced as one of the ten queens competing on the fifth season of RuPaul's Drag Race All Stars. He was the second queen eliminated from the show, ultimately placing 9th.

In November 2020, Ongina hosted "Constellations of Change", a live-streamed cabaret show produced by ViiV Healthcare as a part of its annual Community Summit.

In 2020, he was featured in Magnus Hastings' Rainbow Revolution photography book.

He hosted the 2021 Los Angeles AIDS Walk, and was featured in an accompanied televised special, Localish LA AIDS Walk Special. In July 2022, Ongina headlined the 10th year of Hagerstown Hopes and Hagerstown Pride festival.

Ongina frequently streams on Twitch.

Impact 
Since coming out as HIV-positive, Ongina has become an HIV activist. He was the host for the online web show HIV and Me, a talk show featuring interviews with different individuals on how they live with HIV/AIDS. Ongina also was a spokesperson for OraQuick, one of the first at-home HIV testing kits, in 2013. He won the NewNowNext Award for Most Addictive Reality Star in 2009.

RuPaul's 2009 song "LadyBoy" was inspired by Ongina.

In an interview with amFAR, Ongina said he used his drag persona to advocate for HIV, trans, equality, and basic human rights awareness.

Personal life
Palao is openly gay. He was diagnosed as HIV-positive on April 13, 2006. He married his husband, Ryan, in 2010. He currently lives in Los Angeles.
Palao is involved in an amFAR campaign called Epic Voices, whose mission is to find a cure for AIDS by 2030 and to reengage the conversation about the virus.

Discography
As Featured Artist

Filmography

Television

Music videos

Web series

References

External links 
 
 

1982 births
Living people
American drag queens
Filipino drag queens
Asian-American drag queens
American people of Filipino descent
HIV/AIDS activists
Filipino gay men
American gay men
People with HIV/AIDS
Ongina
Ongina
American LGBT people of Asian descent
Twitch (service) streamers
Participants in American reality television series